Thanthoneeswarar Temple (also called Thanthonrisvaram) is a Hindu temple dedicated to Shiva, located in Woraiyur, a suburb in the town of Tiruchirapalli in Tamil Nadu, India. The temple was built by the Pandya ruler Varaguna Pandiyan II during the 9th century. It has inscriptions dating back to 885 AD during the rule of Cholas. The temple has four daily rituals at various times from 5:30 a.m. to 8 p.m., and three yearly festivals on its calendar. The temple is maintained and administered by hereditary trustees.

The temple is associated with the legend of Shiva appearing as helper or mid-wife for the pregnant Chola Queen Kanthimathi. The bangle festival called valaigkappu celebrated during the Tamil month Thai (January – February) is the most prominent festival celebrated in the temple.

Etymology and legend

Thanthoneeswarar, the presiding deity of the temple, derives its name from Tamil word Thanthondri, meaning the one who formed on his own. As per Hindu legend, Chola queen Kanthimathi was an ardent devotee of Shiva and worshipped Shiva in the temple now known as Thayumanavar swamy Temple. When she was pregnant, she could not climb the hill to reach the temple. Shiva was pleased by the devotion of the queen and is believed to have appeared to her in the form of lingam (an iconic form of Shiva) at this place on his own and blessed her with a safe delivery.

History
The temple was built by the Pandya ruler Varaguna Pandiyan II during the 9th century. It has inscriptions dating back to 885 AD during the rule of Cholas. The temple, in modern times, is maintained and administered by hereditary trustees. The temple has an inscription from The inscriptions speak about the donation made by Ananthan Chandramadhiyar from Chola period recording a gift made by the queen of Thennavan Ilangovar, a feudatory of the Kodumbalur clan. The record gifts golden jewelry as a deposit to the temple, the income of which was to be utilized for desilting the temple tank. The inscriptions was made during the regime of Parantaka I during 911. The remaining amount from the gold was to be utilized for perpetual lighting of the temple. Similar inscriptions are found in other temples in the Trichy region like Vayalur, Allur, Andanallur, Paluvur and Thirupparaitturai indicating the supremacy of the Chola clan along with their relation with the Kodumbalur clan. Historians assign the date of Parantaka to the temple based on the image of Ardhanareeswara.

Architecture

Thanthoneeswarar temple complex has a single prakaram (outer courtyard) and a two-tiered vimana (tower over the sanctum). The central shrine faces east and holds the image of Thanthoneeswarar (Shiva) in the form of lingam made of granite. The granite images of the deities Ganesha (son of Shiva and god of wisdom), Murugan (son of Shiva and god of war), Nandi (the bull and vehicle of Shiva) and Navagraha (nine planetary deities) are located in the hall leading to the sanctum. As in other Shiva temples of Tamil Nadu, the first precinct or the walls around the sanctum of Thanthoneeswarar has images of Dakshinamurthy (Shiva as the Teacher), Durga (warrior-goddess) and Chandikeswarar (a saint and devotee of Shiva). The shrine of Kunkumavalli, the consort of Thanthoneeswarar, faces North and is depicted with Ankusam and lotus in her two hands. The temple precinct is surrounded by granite walls. Unlike other South Indian temples, the temple does not have any Gopuram, an ornamental temple tower. These are typical of the early medieval regime Chola temples. The original walls of the temple carrying some of inscriptions are still present in the temple, while the surrounding structure are of recent origin.

Worship and religious practices

The temple priests perform the puja (rituals) during festivals and on a daily basis. Like other Shiva temples of Tamil Nadu, the priests belong to the Shaiva community, a Brahmin sub-caste. The temple rituals are performed six times a day; Ushathkalam at 5:30 a.m., Kalasanthi at 8:00 a.m., Uchikalam at 10:00 a.m., Sayarakshai at 5:00 p.m., Irandamkalam at 7:00 p.m. and Ardha Jamam at 8:00 p.m. Each ritual comprises four steps: abhisheka (sacred bath), alangaram (decoration), naivethanam (food offering) and deepa aradanai (waving of lamps) for both Thanthoneeswarar and Amman. The worship is held amidst music with nagaswaram (pipe instrument) and tavil (percussion instrument), religious instructions in the Vedas (sacred texts) read by priests and prostration by worshippers in front of the temple mast.
Commemorating the event of Kanthimathi giving bangles to the Naga deity during her pregnancy, a bangle festival is celebrated during the Tamil month of Thai.

References

External links

9th-century Hindu temples
Hindu temples in Tiruchirappalli